Operability is the ability to keep a piece of equipment, a system or a whole industrial installation in a safe and reliable functioning condition, according to pre-defined operational requirements.

In a computing systems environment with multiple systems this includes the ability of products, systems and business processes to work together to accomplish a common task such as finding and returning availability of inventory for flight.

For a gas turbine engine, operability addresses the installed aerodynamic operation of the engine to ensure that it operates with care-free throttle handling without compressor stall or surge or combustor flame-out. There must be no unacceptable loss of power or handling deterioration after ingesting birds, rain and hail or ingesting or accumulating ice. Design and development responsibilities include the components through which the thrust/power-producing flow passes, ie the intake, compressor, combustor, fuel system, turbine and exhaust. They also include the software in the computers which control the way the engine changes its speed in response to the actions of the pilot in selecting a start, selecting different idle settings and higher power ratings such as take-off, climb and cruise. The engine has to start to idle and accelerate and decelerate within agreed, or mandated, times while remaining within operating limits (shaft speeds, turbine temperature, combustor casing pressure) over the required aircraft operating envelope.

Operability is considered one of the ilities and is closely related to reliability, supportability and maintainability.

Operability also refers to whether or not a surgical operation can be performed to treat a patient with a reasonable degree of safety and chance of success.

References

External links
 Software Operability
 Examples Software Operability Requirements

Computer systems